Pablo Gómez Álvarez (born 1946, in Mexico City) is a Mexican politician. He was president of the Party of the Democratic Revolution (PRD) and Senator.

He played a prominent role in the student's movement of 1968. On October 2, 1968, he was taken by the authorities at the Plaza of the Three Cultures during the Tlatelolco massacre, and was imprisoned until 1971. When he left the jail, he immediately rejoined the student's movements, becoming one of the organizers of the mobilization of June 10. He obtained a degree in economics in 1976.

Gómez held the national direction of the Mexican Communist Party and was later elected federal deputy in 1979, being part of a leftist coalition. From 1982 to 1988, he was the president of the Unified Socialist Party of Mexico. Later in 1988, he served as federal deputy again and, while being within the first parliamentary group the Party of the Democratic Revolution had at the Mexican Congress, he was appointed vicecoordinator of it.

From 1992 to 1995, Mr. Gómez held a representative position at the Legislative Assembly of the Federal District. In 1993 he was a main organizer of a recall election against a government in the capital of the Republic. He was the founding director of a weekly magazine issued by the PRD from 1992 to 1994.

He was elected federal deputy twice from the XXIII Federal Electoral District of Coyoacán (at the Federal District), to run at legislatures LVII and LIX. While being a deputy he positioned himself against the FOBAPROA, a banking rescue which required spending many resources, and which was actively promoted by members of the PRI and PAN parties; he eventually achieved an opening of the lists of beneficiaries of the FOBAPROA, though without getting any conclusive results before the negative response of the newly created IPAB. As coordinator of the parliamentary group of the PRD, he managed, for the first time ever in Mexico, to modify the budget by 15 billion pesos that were canalized to the federal organizations, the higher education budget and the retirement funds budget, among others.

In 1999, Pablo Gómez was temporarily president of the PRD. From 2000 and until 2003, he was the representative of the PRD before the Federal Electoral Institute, where -after an investigation- he filed a lawsuit against the President of the Republic, Vicente Fox, for the alleged illegal use of resources through the "Amigos de Fox" -literally, "Friends of Fox"- corruption scandal, and he also developed the investigation on the Pemexgate -another corruption scandal-, for which he was able to get the ratification of the fine of 1 billion pesos against some PRI members.

He has been in two occasions candidate for Head of Government of the Federal District: in the year 2000, losing before Andrés Manuel López Obrador, and in 2006, but that time he did yield his candidacy to Jesús Ortega in a group called TUCOI (All United With the Left) -against the candidacy of Marcelo Ebrard-, which they would lose.

He is the author of several books such as Los gastos secretos del Presidente, a book in which Pablo Gómez denounces the expenses in dollars of Carlos Salinas de Gortari. Another of his works is México 1988: Disputa por la presidencia y Lucha Parlamentaria, book in which he narrates how the electoral fraud was consolidated against Cuauhtémoc Cárdenas and how it was debated at the Chamber of Deputies. In a book derived from his professional thesis, entitled Democracia y crisis política en México, he makes an argumentative defense of the fight for the political freedom in the country.

He is the leader of his own internal political current of the Party of the Democratic Revolution, Movimiento por la Democracia (in English, Movement for Democracy). In it, characters of the PRD concur, such as Inti Muñoz Santini, Alfonso Ramirez Cuellar, Clara Brugada, Javier González Garza, Jorge Martinez Ramos, Juan N. Guerra Ochoa, Salvador Martinez della Rocca, among others.

References

Living people
Deputies of the LXIV Legislature of Mexico
Members of the Senate of the Republic (Mexico)
Presidents of the Party of the Democratic Revolution
1946 births
Politicians from Mexico City
21st-century Mexican politicians
Morena (political party) politicians
20th-century Mexican politicians
Mexican Communist Party politicians
Members of the Chamber of Deputies (Mexico) for Mexico City
Senators of the LX and LXI Legislatures of Mexico